Aceña de Lara or La Aceña is a village in the municipality of Jurisdicción de Lara, located southeast of the province of Burgos, Castilla y León (Spain).

Towns in Spain
Populated places in the Province of Burgos